High Sunderland Hall was a manor house, built c. 1600 just outside Halifax, West Yorkshire and demolished in 1951 after falling into dereliction. The house is perhaps best known for  having supposedly provided Emily Brontë with her description of Wuthering Heights, the house in her eponymous novel. The building stood just a few miles from Law Hill House, Southowram, where she spent some time as a school mistress.

Background

It has long been held that High Sunderland Hall was Emily Brontë’s  main model for the external features of Wuthering Heights while Top Withens was the actual location for the house. In 1904 William Sharp in his book “Literary Geography” said.

“The Withens  is on the hill-top above Haworth, and is supposed to represent the situation of Wuthering Heights. The house itself, as detailed in Emily Bronte's famous romance, is a composite picture ; the interior having been suggested by Ponden Hall, near Haworth, and the exterior by High Sunderland, Law Hill, near Halifax. This, at least, is the opinion of those best acquainted with the topography of the subject"

The drawing on the right was made in 1818 shortly before Emily saw it and this house would have appeared very similar to the building that she viewed. Later photos show the house in some disrepair. The painting on the left of High Sunderland Hall was created in 1911 by Duncan Campbell.

The building was noted for its elaborate and grotesque carvings and Brontë's description of Heathcliff's wild moorland home has unmistakable echoes of the old house.  In Chapter I, Brontë writes: 

The photos below show the resemblance of High Sunderland to Emily’s above description. Photo 1 is the front gate of the house and shows “a quantity of grotesque carving”. Photo 3 is the principal door and depicts even more of these grotesque figures. There are also griffins on the building – Photo 2 shows two eagle like griffins above the arch at the top of the structure.

Photos of High Sunderland Hall circa 1900

See also

Ponden Hall, reputedly the inspiration for Thrushcross Grange, the home of the Lintons in Wuthering Heights

References

Buildings and structures in Calderdale
Wuthering Heights
Demolished buildings and structures in England
Manor houses in England
Country houses in West Yorkshire
Buildings and structures demolished in 1951